I Can See You is the seventh EP by American hardcore punk band Black Flag. It was released three years after their breakup and was their last studio recording for 24 years, until the release of their seventh studio album What The... in 2013. The material was recorded before the departure of drummer Bill Stevenson and bassist Kira Roessler, and three of the tracks were originally included on the cassette and CD editions of the In My Head (1985) album.

Track listing
All songs written by Greg Ginn and Henry Rollins except where noted.

"I Can See You" - (Ginn) 3:19
"Kickin' & Stickin'" - 1:23
"Out of This World" - (Roessler/Stevenson) – 2:12
"You Let Me Down" – 3:40

References

Black Flag (band) EPs
SST Records albums
1989 EPs
Hardcore punk EPs